Oleiagrimonas citrea is a Gram-negative, rod-shaped and aerobic bacterium from the genus of Oleiagrimonas which has been isolated from tidal flat sediments from the Suncheon Bay in Korea.

References

External links
Type strain of Oleiagrimonas citrea at BacDive -  the Bacterial Diversity Metadatabase

Xanthomonadales
Bacteria described in 2017